Ammotrophus arachnoides is a species of sand dollar of the family Arachnoididea. Their external skeleton, known as a test, is covered with spines. It belongs to the genus Ammotrophus and lives in the sea off southern Australia. Ammotrophus arachnoides was first scientifically described in 1938 by Hubert Clark.

References 

Clypeasteridae
Animals described in 1938
Taxa named by Hubert Lyman Clark